Bob Gregory (born April 25, 1963)is an American college football coach and former player who is currently the special teams coordinator and safeties coach at Stanford, and previously served as the interim head coach, defensive coordinator, and inside linebackers coach at the University of Washington. He served as the interim head football coach at Boise State University for one game during the 2013 season, the Hawaii Bowl.

Gregory took over as interim head coach at Washington on November 14, 2021, after Washington fired Jimmy Lake. Gregory also coached in Lake's place the day prior while Lake was serving a suspension.

In December of 2022, Gregory joined Troy Taylor's inaugural staff at Stanford as the special teams coordinator and safeties coach.

Head coaching record

References

External links
 Washington profile

1963 births
Living people
American football defensive backs
American football linebackers
Boise State Broncos football coaches
California Golden Bears football coaches
Oregon Ducks football coaches
Washington Huskies football coaches
Washington University Bears football coaches
Washington State Cougars football players
Willamette Bearcats football coaches